Morimopsis truncatipennis is a species of beetle in the family Cerambycidae. It was described by Stephan von Breuning in 1940. It is known from India.

References

Morimopsini
Beetles described in 1940